

The Bleriot-SPAD S.25 was a single-seater long-distance airplane built at the request of Leith Jensen who wanted to connect Newfoundland to Iceland.

Design
The S.25 was a biplane with a monocoque fuselage of wood and canvas construction and was to have a watertight fuselage and quick emptying tanks were to be used as floats, where appropriate. Jensen's bid to fly from Newfoundland to Iceland was abandoned after the feat of Alcook and Brown, so the S.25 flew on August 29, 1921 as a sports aircraft.

Specifications

See also

References

1920s French aircraft
SPAD aircraft
Biplanes
Single-engined tractor aircraft
Aircraft first flown in 1921
Rotary-engined aircraft